Oncopeltus cingulifer is a species of seed bug in the family Lygaeidae. It is found in North, Central, and South America.

References

External links

 

Lygaeidae
Hemiptera of South America
Hemiptera of Central America
Hemiptera of North America
Insects described in 1874
Taxa named by Carl Stål